Jesper von Hertzen (born 30 June 1980) is a Finnish badminton player. He was the runners-up of Estonian International tournament in the men's doubles event in 2007 and 2015.

Achievements

BWF International Challenge/Series 
Men's doubles

  BWF International Challenge tournament
  BWF International Series tournament
  BWF Future Series tournament

References

External links 
 

1980 births
Living people
Finnish male badminton players
21st-century Finnish people